Ballophilus conservatus is a species of centipede in the genus Ballophilus. It is found on the island of Java. The original description of this species is based on a specimen measuring about 15 mm in length with 69 pairs of legs.

References 

Ballophilidae